Terence McKenna is a Canadian documentary filmmaker.
He has collaborated with his brother Brian McKenna, also an award-winning filmmaker.

In 2007, he won the Pierre Burton award.

Meltdown: The Secret History of the Global Financial Collapse
In the CBC series Doc Zone, McKenna investigated the history of the global financial collapse from "backrooms at the highest levels of world governments and banking institutions," and "from Wall Street to Dubai to China which began in September 2008. The series included "After the Fall", "Paying the Price", "A Global Tsunami", "The Men who Crashed the World".

Partial filmography
Meltdown: The Secret History of the Global Financial Collapse
 The Secret History of 9/11, 2006
 Land, Gold and Women, 2006
 Son of al Qaeda, 2004
 Life and Times of John Paul II, 2003
 Korea: The Unfinished War, 2003
 Trail of a Terrorist, 2001
 Black October (film), 2000
 The Valour and the Horror, 1992
The Squamish Five, 1989

References

External links

1954 births
Living people
Anglophone Quebec people
Canadian television reporters and correspondents
Canadian documentary film directors
Canadian documentary film producers
Canadian Screen Award winners
Film directors from Montreal